Libero International was an English language Japanese anarchist journal published in Kobe between January 1975 and March 1980. The publisher was the  CIRA-Nippon group. The magazine was published in English. "Wat Tyler" was the name adopted by one of the editorial collective.

See also
 List of anarchist periodicals

References

Selected articles
 "Anarchism and the May 4th Movement" (Issue 4-5)
 "Bakunin in Japan" (Issue 5, September 1978)
 "A Message from the S.I.C."(March 1980), No. 30

External links
Libero International website archiving all published issues
WorldCat

1975 establishments in Japan
1980 disestablishments in Japan
Anarchism in Japan
Anarchist periodicals
Defunct political magazines published in Japan
English-language magazines
Magazines established in 1975
Magazines disestablished in 1980
Mass media in Kobe